Püssä is a village in Rõuge Parish, Võru County in southern Estonia.

References

Villages in Võru County